Juanita Bynum (born January 16, 1959) is an American gospel singer, author, and pastor.

In 2007, she released an album titled Piece of My Passion, and The New York Times described her as "the most prominent black female television evangelist in the country". She is the author of The Threshing Floor.

Discography 
 Gospel Goes Classical (with Jonathan Butler) (2006)
 Piece of My Passion (2007)
 Morning Glory (2010)

Bibliography

References 

Living people
1959 births
African-American Christian clergy
African-American women writers
American gospel singers
American television evangelists
People from Chicago
20th-century African-American women singers
21st-century African-American women singers
21st-century African-American people